Julia Maidhof (born 13 March 1998) is a German female handball player for SG BBM Bietigheim and the German national team.

She represented Germany at the 2020 European Women's Handball Championship.

Achievements
EHF European League:
Winner: 2022
Bundesliga:
Winner: 2022

References

External links

1998 births
Living people
People from Aschaffenburg
Sportspeople from Lower Franconia
German female handball players
21st-century German women